Sapanca station is a railway station along the Istanbul-Ankara railway in the town of Sapanca, Turkey. It is serviced by the Istanbul-Arifiye limited-stop regional train, the Ada Express. Until 2012, Sapanca was a stop on the Haydarpaşa-Adapazarı Regional, which operated frequently. Other express trains heading for Ankara and points beyond would skip the station. Today, the high-speed Yüksek Hızlı Tren service passes the station on its own right of way.

References

Railway stations in Sakarya Province
Railway stations opened in 1891
1891 establishments in the Ottoman Empire